DWRR-FM (pronounced as DW-double-R; 101.9  FM Stereo), broadcasting as MOR 101.9, was a commercial radio station owned by ABS-CBN Corporation and previously operated by the Manila Radio division and the Star Creatives Group. Broadcast live throughout the Philippine archipelago, and throughout the world via The Filipino Channel (TFC), it was the flagship FM station of MOR Philippines and the number 1 FM radio station in Metro Manila, Mega Manila as well as the entire Philippines according to KBP Radio Research Council. The studios were located at ABS-CBN Broadcasting Center, Sgt. Esguerra Ave., corner Mo. Ignacia Ave., Diliman, Quezon City, and the station's 22.5 kW FM stereo transmitter was located at the Eugenio Lopez Center, Santa Cruz, Sumulong Highway, Antipolo, Rizal.

DWRR was founded in 1956 as one of the radio stations of Chronicle Broadcasting Network (now ABS-CBN). It was revived in 1986 and reformatted several times. On May 5, 2020, it suspended its broadcasting activities, together with that of its television and sister radio stations, following a cease-and-desist order issued by the National Telecommunications Commission due to the expiration of ABS-CBN's legislative franchise to operate. The online radio permanently ceased operations on August 28, 2020, as a result of a franchise denial made by the House of Representatives on July 10, 2020.

History

DZYL-FM/DZYK-FM/DZMM-FM (1956–1972)
DZYL-FM 102 MHz, later named DZYK-FM 102.1 MHz, was the first FM radio station in the Philippines and sole FM station of the former Chronicle Broadcasting Network (CBN). It was founded in 1956 and played the latest songs of that era. In 1957, CBN bought Alto Broadcasting System (ABS), resulting in a merger under the name Bolinao Electronics Corporation, which was changed in 1967 to ABS-CBN Broadcasting Corporation. Staffed by eight DJs, the station was popularized to listeners in the Greater Manila area. In 1968, DZYK-FM moved to 101.9 MHz and changed its call letters to DZMM-FM.

DWWK-FM/OK 101 (1973–1986)
DZMM-FM remained the FM radio station of ABS-CBN until 1972, when Ferdinand Marcos declared martial law and all ABS-CBN stations, including two TV channels and six AM radio stations in Manila, were shut down under strict censorship. The FM station was taken over by Banahaw Broadcasting Corporation in 1973 and the station's callsign was changed to DWWK-FM. As DWWK-FM, the station became best known for its the jazz format (1979 to 1984). It was staffed by Jing Magsaysay, Wayne Enage, Ed Picson, Dody Lacuna, Ronnie Malig, Pinky Villarama and Ronnie Quintos. In 1985, the call sign and format was changed to DWOK-FM, the first "AM-formatted" FM station, featuring news, public service programs, and music from the yesteryears. Helen Vela also came to DWOK with her counselling program Lovingly Yours, Helen.

Knock Out Radio (1986–1987)
During the 1986 People Power Revolution, the government-controlled radio and TV stations were stormed by reformist rebels and DWOK, DWAN (formerly known as DWWA) and BBC-2 were dissolved, and in July, after the fall of the Marcos regime, the newly formed Presidential Commission on Good Governance returned DWOK together with DWWW (630 kHz) to ABS-CBN. DWOK changed its callsign to DWKO and resumed broadcasting on a test basis on July 16. Lito Balquiedra Jr., Vice-President for Radio, spearheaded the return of the network to the local broadcasting scene. The station's former disc jockey Peter Musñgi (then known as Peter Rabbit) became the network's voice-over and voiced the station's new slogan, "Panalo Ka Talaga!". Sister station DZMM 630 began broadcasting the following week.

The network started recruiting both experienced and new employees and DJs. On September 14, 1986, the testing period ended and DWKO-FM was relaunched under the name Knock-Out Radio 101.9, the first FM radio station with an AM format. It operated daily from 5:00 am to 2:00 am, playing the latest Pinoy hits by artists such as Rico J. Puno, Yoyoy Villame, and APO Hiking Society, as well as OPM stars such as Gary Valenciano, Regine Velasquez, Janno Gibbs, and Donna Cruz, as well as Filipino Christmas songs. The parent TV station ABS-CBN Channel 2 resumed broadcasting the same day. At this time the ABS-CBN stations were known as the Star Network.

DWKO-FM ended its broadcasts on February 28, 1987, a span of almost five months, one of the station's shortest-lived iterations.

Zoo FM (1987–1989)
The following day, March 1, 1987, the station was reformatted as Zoo FM 101.9 (DZOO-FM; read as D-Z-double O-FM), with a diamond logo and a slightly uptrend pop sound. The jingles used for the station were produced by JAM Creative Productions. Its slogan was Hayop Talaga! and it was manned by a group of eight DJs including George Boone, Jeremiah Jr., Bob Curry, Bill O'Brien, Andy Santillan (aka Dave Ryan, later known as "The Unbeatable"), and Joe Monkey. The station played disco music, top 40 and OPM hits by stars such as Gary V, Randy Santiago, Regine Velasquez, Ogie Alcasid, and Sharon Cuneta, especially after the implementation of Executive Order No. 255 by President Corazon Aquino.

Its competitors included The Giant 97.1 WLS-FM (now Barangay LS 97.1), 99.5 RT (now 99.5 Play FM), Magic 89.9, 89 DMZ (now Wave 89.1), and NU 107 (now Wish 1075). Ultimately, despite the resurgence of ABS-CBN, which by 1988 had top place in the TV industry, WLS's ratings dominance led to the demise of the Zoo FM format. At midnight on the night of July 15, 1989, the station signed off with "Farewell" by Raymond Lauchengco.

Radio Romance (1989–1996)
At 6:00 am on July 16, 1989, the station was again reformatted to what became known as 101.9 Radio Romance (RR), playing all easy-listening love songs except for a Sunday OPM program. At first all the DJs were female, including Amy Perez; it became the first FM station to implement the technological innovation of originating playlists from compact discs. That year also signaled the station's first nationwide reach when 103.1 MHz Baguio simulcasted its signals, ensuring uninterrupted listening for travelers from Manila to as far north as Ilocos Sur; in the early 1990s it began simulcasting via satellite to stations across the country. "Radio Romance" became the title of a theme song for the station composed by Jose Mari Chan and of a movie.

Radio Romance signed off for the last time on April 28, 1996.

WRR 101.9 (1996–2009)
On April 29, 1996, DWRR relaunched itself as a mainstream pop music station branded WRR 101.9. It also became the first FM radio station to be fully broadcast in Filipino language, in order to compete with rival English-language FM stations such as GMA Network's Campus Radio 97.1 WLS, Magic 89.9 and 99.5 RT. (Prior to the adoption of masa format, all FM stations were English-based.) By the end of that year, all ABS-CBN FM stations had switched from English to their native languages. WRR's initial slogan was All the Hits, All the Time!. On November 2, 1998, it adopted the tagline For Life! (derived from a co-owned station in Cebu), which emphasized that the DJs entertain the listeners' normal lives.

In late 1999, DWRR's transmitting equipment moved from the ABS-CBN Broadcast Center that had been used before martial law to a new transmitter tower at the Eugenio Lopez Center in Antipolo because of the upgrading of the Millennium Transmitter.

In July 2005, the WRR brand was dropped from the name and the station adopted the slogan Alam Mo Na 'Yan! (You Already Know It!). In November 2008, the slogan was changed again to Bespren! (Bestfriend!).

The station had its last broadcast under the 101.9 For Life! brand on September 19, 2009, and underwent a transition period playing automated music in preparation for a relaunch of DWRR-FM's new branding on October 1, 2009. However, due to the effects of Typhoon Ondoy (Ketsana) in Manila, the rebrand was postponed for a month, while the station temporarily went under the name "ABS-CBN 101.9 FM" or simply "101.9". The DJs resumed live spiels at the top of the hour, but did not mention any brand or slogan.

Tambayan (2009–2013)

At 9:00 pm on November 4, 2009, there was an audiovisual presentation about the history of DWRR. Afterwards, the station was relaunched as Tambayan 101.9 (tambayan is the Tagalog word for "hangout") starting with the theme song and live debut at a venue in Makati. Tambayan launched its video streaming, called Tambayan TV, where DJs are seen live from the booth. Between songs, information plugs were seen (such as Tambayan's Slumbook). Just like DZMM Teleradyo, plugs were also aired during commercial gaps. Tambayan TV is aired 24 hours over the Internet.

The station was also launched via HD Radio technology.

In mid-May 2013, the Tambayan brand was dropped and was reverted back again to simply "101.9" for another transition period signifying another rebrand.

MOR For Life! (2013–2020)

At midnight on July 8, 2013, 101.9 FM rebranded as MOR 101.9 My Only Radio For Life!. Regular programming began at 5:00 am, with Joco Loco, Maki Rena and Eva Ronda as the first jocks to go on board. DJs from WRR 101.9 For Life! (Toni, China Heart, Reggie Valdez, Martin D., and Geri) were still part of the on-air team, as well as DJs from the former Tambayan 101.9 roster: Charlie, Jasmin, Arnold Rei, Bea, ChaCha (Czarina Marie Balba), and Onse (Onse Tolentino). The rebranding created a unified brand under MOR for ABS-CBN's FM radio stations nationwide and reverted to the "For Life" slogan first used during the WRR 101.9 For Life! era. At the same time, the station pioneered the face of drama broadcasting on the FM band by launching the daily drama anthology program Dear MOR.

In June 2018, MOR Manila and its regional stations announced a further rebrand as MOR Philippines, to connect 101.9 and its provincial stations with unified program brands and strong music choices; thus, the new tagline "One Vibe, One Sound." National programming blocks began on August 11, 2018, with the launch of Dyis Is It and MOR Presents with David Bang.

On June 1, 2019, MOR 101.9 video streaming moved to Sky Cable Channel 239 from Sony Channel Asia. It could also be seen on Channel 240 (MOR 97.1 Cebu) and Channel 241 (MOR 103.1 Baguio).

In March 2020, in response to COVID-19 enhanced quarantine regulations and their effects on staffing, the station implemented a scaled-down programming operation; it also began a hookup with its sister AM-station DZMM Radyo Patrol 630 on the same day.

Shutdown

On May 5, 2020, the station signed off together with sister stations ABS-CBN, S+A, and DZMM, due to a cease and desist order issued from the National Telecommunications Commission, which ordered the network to indefinitely suspend operations after the expiration of its legislative franchise. DJ Jhai Ho was the final disc jockey to go on air with a valedictory message, with Yeng Constantino's "Salamat" as its last song broadcast as background music; the MOR Philippines station ID was played afterwards for the last time before signing off.

After the House of Representatives denied ABS-CBN a new franchise on July 10, 2020, ABS-CBN announced that it would lay off most of its employees beginning August 31. On the July 16 episode of Failon Ngayon sa TeleRadyo, DJ Chacha, anchor of Dear MOR and formerly Heartbeats, confirmed that the radio station along with other regional MOR stations would fold on that August 31.

Instead of August 31, MOR Philippines signed off in the evening on August 28, 2020; ABS-CBN Regional's 12 local TV Patrol and 10 local morning shows also signed off.

MOR 101.9 final DJs
Popoy (2005–2020), carried over to MOR Entertainment
Onse (2009–2011; 2013–2020), carried over to MOR Entertainment
Chico Martin (January 1, 2020 – August 31, 2020), carried over to MOR Entertainment, now with Energy FM 106.7
Nicki Morena (2018–2020), carried over to MOR Entertainment, now with PIE Channel
Maki Rena (2013–2020), now with Win Radio
Joco Loco (2013–2020), now with Win Radio
Eva Ronda (2013–2020), now with Win Radio
DJ Jhai Ho (2013–2020), carried over to MOR Entertainment
Kisses (2016–2020), carried over to MOR Entertainment
Chacha Babes (2008–2020), now with 92.3 Radyo5 True FM
Kimbo (2018–2020), carried over to MOR Entertainment
Toni Aquino (2005–2020), moved to Eagle FM 95.5, now with Super Radyo 594
Bea (2010–2020), carried over to MOR Entertainment
Biboy Bwenas (2017–2020), went back to Win Radio as Macho Bibbo
Ana Ramsey (2016–2020), carried over to MOR Entertainment

Former MOR 101.9 DJs
Chito Moreno (2013–2015)
Danny Jay
Martin D. (1996–2016)
Bob Zilla, now a voiceover of A2Z and Cine Mo!
Peter Musñgi (1968–1972, 1986–1989)
Chinapaps also known as Chinaheart (1997–2018), currently head of MOR Digital Team
Digong Dantes (2016–2020)
Reggie V. (2013–2020)
Kinoy
Ms. M
Josh
Daddy Alex Calleja (2013-2016)
Papi Charlz
Chikki Boomboom
Jasmin (2009–2019)
Yumi, now with TeleRadyo and ANC
Mr Right (2016-2019)
Amy Perez (1989–1991)
George Boone Mercado (1987–1989)
Jeremiah Jr. (1987–1989)
Bob Curry (1987–1989)
Bill O'Brien (1987–1989)
Andy Santillan, also known as Dave Ryan (1987–1989)
Doddy Lacuna (1973-1986)
Jing Magsaysay (1973-1986)
Joey de Leon (1969-1972)
Amy Godinez

Former MOR 101.9 Programs
Dyis Is It
Heartbeats
Midnight Trip
Sabado Sikat
On Air
Kapamilya Komedya
My Only Request
MOR Golden Hits 
Music On Rewind
Happy Happy Hapon
MOR Biga10
MOR Mix
MOR Playlist
Yun Na As In
Quickie
Playist pa MORe

Awards
 16th KBP Golden Dove Awardee, Best Radio DJ for Martin D.
 14th KBP Golden Dove Awardee, Best 'Variety Show Host for Laila.
 13th KBP Golden Dove Awardee for Outstanding FM Radio Station.
 13th KBP Golden Dove Awardee for Texter's Choice FM Station – Luzon
 12th KBP Golden Dove Awardee for 'Best Radio Station.
 Recognized as the Number 1 Radio Station in Metro Manila based on the 2002 KBP-RRC Survey.
Station of the Year in the 2002 Dangal ng Pilipinas-Consumer's Choice Awards.
Best Public Service Ad (Pinoy, Ang Galing Mo!) in the 2002 Catholic Mass Media Awards.

Theme music

Pre-MOR era 
As Radio Romance 101.9, the jingle was composed and sung by Jose Mari Chan, used from November 6, 1995, to April 28, 1996. This theme was later reused - albeit with altered lyrics, by the Catholic Media Network's Spirit FM stations from 2002 to 2012, sung by local band Tellayouthska.
In 1998, the "For-Life" jingle was launched. This was sung by Jolina Magdangal-Escueta and Jimmy Bondoc. This also had other shorter versions by various recording artists, having used until March 6, 2004. The first verse would later be reused in the current MOR jingle with altered lyrics. A re-hashed version was used from March 7, 2004, to September 18, 2005, performed by Heart Evangelista and Erik Santos. 
 American singer Patti Austin also sang a shorter version of the "For-Life" jingle.
On September 19, 2005, the station launched a new and hip station jingle courtesy of Vhong Navarro on vocals using the slogan Alam Mo Na 'Yan! in the lyrics, used until August 31, 2007.
On September 1, 2007, the last "For-Life" jingle under the station's independence was launched, composed by Raimund Marasigan of Sandwich (former drummer of The Eraserheads) and interpreted by Itchyworms and by Yeng Constantino-Asuncion of Pinoy Dream Academy, used until September 19, 2009.
As Tambayan 101.9, the 1st version of the jingle was interpreted by Skabeche Band and Empoy, used from November 4, 2009, to December 2010.
In December 2010, the theme was remixed and sung by the DJs for the station's Christmas 2010 jingle, being used again in Christmas 2011.
The 2nd version of the Tambayan jingle, which is a DJ-like mixed jingle, was used by the station from January 2011 to February 14, 2012, and it was done by the station's resident DJ Martin D.
The 3rd version of the Tambayan jingle was a remix of the 2nd jingle which was heard on the Budots Budots program. This was the jingle used by the station from February 15  to March 4, 2012, making it an interim jingle since this was used while the new version of the next jingle was being composed.
The 4th and final version of the Tambayan 101.9 jingle is sung by Jovit Baldivino, Yeng Constantino-Asuncion, Gloc-9 and Phylum Band, and is used from March 5, 2012, to May 31, 2013, the time when the management put an end to the station's distinct branding from its regional counterparts for its upcoming MOR branding.
The 2nd Tambayan Christmas jingle was sung by KZ Tandingan featuring Loonie, used from November 24, 2012, to January 6, 2013. This is their last Christmas jingle under the station's independence.

MOR era 
On July 7, 2013, together with the rebranding of the station to MOR, a new jingle & music video was launched on ASAP 18 and was performed by various artists. The original version of the new jingle was recorded by Toni Gonzaga-Soriano, Vice Ganda, and Daniel Padilla; and was adopted by all MOR stations. The jingle was used until August 7, 2016, in favor of a romance-themed version recorded by Bailey May and Ylona Garcia and used extensively on the Manila station from the day after, with provincial stations using it on an occasional basis; yet was reverted to the original 2013 version of the jingle by June 4, 2017, with the newer rendition being used only as an alternate. Portions of the jingle contain elements from the first For Life jingle for its first verse with altered lyrics and the pre-2013 MOR jingle when it was a group of regional stations. On July 21, 2018, with the upcoming relaunch as MOR Philippines, a new network jingle was introduced during its Pinoy Music Awards, combining the 2013 jingle with David Bang's MOR regional stingers. Its new jingle was formally launched at noon of September 24, 2018. Toni, Vice, and Daniel were tapped once again to sing the revamped jingle. This version is still used in the MOR Entertainment online radio until now.
The 1st version of the MOR Christmas jingle is sung by Angeline Quinto and Juris Lim, used from November 2013 to January 2014.
The 2nd version of the MOR Christmas jingle is sung by Michael Pangilinan and Morissette, used from November 2014 to January 2015.
There is also a Valentines' version which was used every February from 2015 to 2020.
The 3rd version of the MOR Christmas jingle is sung by Marlo Mortel and Janella Salvador, used from November 2015 to January 2016.
The 4th version of the MOR Christmas jingle is sung by CJ Navato and Kristel Fulgar, used from November 2016 to January 2017.

MOR Philippines stations
MOR was also broadcast to 15 provincial stations in the Philippines.

See also
 ABS-CBN
 DWWX-TV
 DZMM Radyo Patrol 630
 MOR Philippines (ABS-CBN's FM radio station)
 S+A

References

External links
 
 

MOR Philippines stations
Adult top 40 radio stations
Hot adult contemporary radio stations in the Philippines
OPM formatted radio stations in the Philippines
Defunct radio stations in Metro Manila
Radio stations established in 1956
Assets owned by ABS-CBN Corporation
Radio stations disestablished in 2020